Abdullah Nangyal Bettani is a Pashtun nationalist politician and a leader of the National Democratic Movement (NDM). He is a founding member of the Pashtun Tahafuz Movement (PTM).

Political career
In the 2013 general election, Nangyal contested for NA-47 (Tribal Area-XII) Frontier Regions as an independent candidate. He lost to Qaiser Jamal of the Pakistan Tehreek-e-Insaf (PTI).

In the 2018 general election, Nangyal contested for NA-51 (Tribal Area-XII) Frontier Regions as an independent candidate. He lost to Mufti Abdul Shakoor of the Muttahida Majlis-e-Amal (MMA).

Detentions
In February 2019, Nangyal was arrested by the police outside the National Press Club in Islamabad along with dozens of other PTM activists including Gulalai Ismail during protests against the extrajudicial murder of one of the leaders of PTM, Arman Loni. The arrests received widespread criticism in Pakistan and internationally, including condemnation from the President of Afghanistan Ashraf Ghani, Amnesty International, and the Pakistan Peoples Party (PPP).

See also
Mohsin Dawar
Gulalai Ismail
Jamila Gilani
Bushra Gohar
Afrasiab Khattak

References

Living people
Pashtun people
People from Tank Subdivision
Pashtun Tahafuz Movement politicians
Year of birth missing (living people)
National Democratic Movement (Pakistan) politicians